Matthew O'Connor may refer to:

Matthew O'Connor (soccer) (born 1989), Canadian soccer player
Matthew O'Connor (swimmer) (born 1971), British swimmer

See also
Matthew O'Conor (1773–1844), Irish historian
Matt O'Connor (disambiguation)